is a 2D generic stick figure-styled silhouette character, created by Nintendo and an amalgamation of the Game & Watch handheld consoles.  He was created for the Super Smash Bros. series, with an intention of representing the Game & Watch collection, as the consoles had no main mascot, rather characters designed for the minigames.  He debuted in Super Smash Bros. Melee, and every other future title, including Super Smash Bros. Brawl, Super Smash Bros. for Nintendo 3DS and Wii U, and Super Smash Bros. Ultimate. Mr. Game & Watch has appeared as a cameo in several other Nintendo games, such as Donkey Kong Country Returns, WarioWare: Touched!, Rhythm Heaven Fever and Super Mario Odyssey.

The Game & Watch consoles were conceptualized by Gunpei Yokoi, and Makoto Kano created their visuals. Each visual was carefully conceived, drawn polished, and tested by a small group of designers, consisting of Yokoi and Kano alongside Masao Yamamoto and Takehiro Izushi. His appearance in Super Smash Bros. is based on the various games released, from which his moveset and animation style is inspired. His appearance and overall existence have received generally positive reception, being called a classic and iconic character, even being more commonly associated with Super Smash Bros. more than his own franchise. His role in Super Smash Bros. became more negative, being recognized as an unviable choice in professional play at Melee and 3DS & Wii U. On the other hand, while considered relatively viable in Ultimate, he is seen as an annoying character to fight against, which competitive player Maister is criticized for.

Concept and design 

Although the specific character did not exist until 2001, he is an amalgamation of the avatars from the Game & Watch series of handheld consoles released by Nintendo in the 1980s. Video game and electronic toy designer Gunpei Yokoi witnessed a businessman fiddling with an LCD calculator out of boredom while riding a bullet train. Inspired by this, he conceptualized a portable electronic minigame that doubled as a watch for killing time. The visuals and LCD design were conducted by Makoto Kano, although he was also present in the original handheld's hardware production. At the time there were only a handful of designers, so  work wasn't equally balanced and multiple people worked on numerous different tasks. According to Kano, he designed the system shell and its color, the packaging, and the stick-figure silhouettes.

The games were designed around everyday tasks, which is why the titles had simple concepts such as cooking. The game and its looks were designed on a blackboard by the development team, and Masao Yamamoto drew up the ideas in a notebook. He gave the visuals to Kano for polishing, where he recalled how he would say, "The rest is up to you." After he would redraw the designs, it then became clear whether or not they would continue with the project. They would then create a model of how the game would function using plastic and wheat bulbs about the size of an A4 sheet of paper to test the smoothness of the visuals. Yokoi was very keen on making character movement natural, which the designers dubbed the "Yokoi standard". Yamamoto and Takehiro Izushi worked on the software afterwards.

The first handheld released was Ball in 1980, the spiritual introduction to Mr. Game & Watch. Kano's enjoyment of visual design for the handhelds were increased with the introduction of a new line of Game & Watch devices, the Wide Screen variants. In a 2010 interview on Iwata Asks, Kano stated how he modelled the octopus character for the title Octupus after Hatchan the Octopus, a Japanese Manga character who first appeared in 1931. He tried to design the octopus so it would be recognized as such in other countries. This character would also later be used as an attack option for Mr. Game & Watch in Super Smash Bros. Brawl and onward.

The specific character known as Mr. Game & Watch was introduced into Super Smash Bros. Melee in 2001; as a representation of the series as a whole, his attacks and other abilities are direct references to various Game & Watch titles. His character icon also represents the Game & Watch's alarm feature, where it depicts the character holding a bell.  The character comes with seven alternate colors to choose from before a match. He has appeared in every Super Smash Bros. game following, namely Brawl, 3DS and Wii U, and Ultimate.

Appearances 
Mr. Game & Watch originally appeared as playable characters in the 1980 Game & Watch game Ball, as well as Flagman, Vermin, Fire, Judge, Manhole, Helmet, Lion, Parachute, Octopus, Chef, Turtle Bridge, Fire Attack, Oil Panic, Greenhouse, Rain Shower and Life Boat. The Game & Watch brand is represented in Nintendo's Super Smash Bros. series with the character Mr. Game & Watch, appearing in Super Smash Bros. Melee, Super Smash Bros. Brawl, Super Smash Bros. for Nintendo 3DS and Wii U and Super Smash Bros. Ultimate. As he represents the Game & Watch series, he pre-dates Pac-Man by one month as being the oldest character on the roster.

Beyond the Super Smash Bros. and Game & Watch series, Mr. Game & Watch has also appeared in Game & Watch Gallery 4. He has also made cameo appearances in Donkey Kong Country Returns, WarioWare: Touched!, Rhythm Heaven Fever, Nintendo 3DS Sound and Super Mario Odyssey.

Reception

Mr. Game & Watch has received a generally positive reception, mostly the character appearance on Super Smash Bros. series. The unexpected and relatively obscure origins of Mr. Game & Watch are often considered the main appeal of the character, giving him a unique visual identity that stands out among other characters on the roster and video game characters in general. UGO.com listed Mr. Game & Watch on their list of "The Cutest Characters", stating "Mr. Game & Watch is adorable because he's completely oblivious to his condition." David Mello of Screen Rant ranked him second of the forgotten Nintendo characters, and stated that Mr. Game & Watch is a classic character from the younger days of Nintendo. Michael Derosa of Screen Rant also listed Mr. Game & Watch as the sixth character that should be added in Mario Kart, and stated that 2D character in the magical 3D Mario Kart world would offer the type of visual contrast that gamers love.

Masahiro Sakurai described Mr. Game & Watch along with Duck Hunt as fighters that fall "outside of people's typical expectations", and explained further that without such characters the roster might only have typical “hero/heroine” type fighters in the lineup, which would be "probably not very interesting". IGN noted that Mr. Game & Watch became weirder as it maintains his unique 2D nature in an otherwise 3D world. Jeremy Parish of Polygon ranked 73 fighters from Super Smash Bros. Ultimate "from garbage to glorious", placed Mr. Game & Watch last on the list and criticized the character for not being a "real classic character". Gavin Jasper of Den of Geek ranked Mr. Game & Watch as 21st of Super Smash Bros. Ultimate characters, praising the character addition to the roster and stated that the character "is to Nintendo icons what Bosko was to Looney Tunes". Cecilia D'Anastasio of Kotaku listed Game & Watch on Super Smash Bros. for Nintendo 3DS and Wii U as the fifth most annoying character in the game. CJ Andriessen of Destructoid criticized and placed him fourth from the last list on Super Smash Bros. Ultimate characters.

In Super Smash Bros. for Wii U, Mr. Game & Watch was considered "low tier", or one of the weakest characters available for selection. In 2020, Enrique "Maister" Hernández Solís became the first professional Super Smash Bros. player to garner successful tournament results while using Mr. Game & Watch; prior, he remained an unranked position in the Panda Global Rankings charts until eventually ranking 6th place globally. In Super Smash Bros. Ultimate, while Mr. Game & Watch was still considered low-tier at the time of Maister's 2019 win, the Smash community eventually realized that the character had become significantly stronger. He began receiving criticism toward the character and himself, with people blaming his success for the character he chose and not his skill, pointing out abilities of his that were too powerful or too fast to react to. Maister commented on the backlash and acknowledged the character's criticism due to his faults. However, he struggled with negativity and threats directed towards him personally and it has been chosen to lower how much time he spent on social media.

Controversy

In the 1982 Game & Watch title Fire Attack, the player controls a cowboy defending his fort from an onslaught of Native Americans attempting to burn the fort down. In the game, the Native Americans wear a feather on their head and attack the fort with torches. This has since been deemed as a racist Native American stereotype, and the racial aspects of the characters were removed for the re-release of the game in Game & Watch Gallery 4.

For Super Smash Bros. Ultimate in 2018, Mr. Game & Watch was given new designs to his animations; instead of his overall appearance remaining a stick figure silhouette, whenever he would perform an action represented from a Game & Watch title, he would also assume the cosmetics of the character in question and look like them, then returning to his default look when the action is complete. With this came the return of his Native American counterpart, which is referenced in his forward Smash attack. After a Nintendo Direct that showcased the character, he was used in gameplay during a Japanese livestream, where the attack was used and visible for about half a second.

Later, claims were made on Twitter and an online message board that the character represented a racist Native American stereotype. These claims were later echoed elsewhere online. Nintendo took action by removing the feather headband on his head and responded with the following claim to Eurogamer:

"Nintendo has been planning to distribute an update for Super Smash Bros. Ultimate that removes the feather from the silhouette of Mr. Game & Watch.  The original game on which this depiction of the character is based was released more than three decades ago and does not represent our company values today.  We sincerely apologise that this change was not noticed in our marketing material and are continuing our work to make Super Smash Bros. Ultimate an experience that is both welcoming and fun for everyone."

Amiibo
In September 2015, the Super Smash Bros. line of Amiibo released A Mr. Game & Watch Amiibo collectible.  The design also come with 3 additional detachable alternatives of the character in different positions and moves. Additionally, he is sold as well in the Amiibo Retro Pack, a 3 part Amiibo set including, Mr. Game & Watch, R.O.B., and Duck Hunt.

The character can be scanned into the 3DS/Wii U and Ultimate titles, which a player can use to create a personal CPU, which can train and fight using artificial intelligence.  The Amiibo can also be used to unlock a cosmetic option for Super Mario Maker and Yoshi's Woolly World, as well as the 3DS port of the latter.

Notes

References 

 

Game & Watch
Male characters in video games
Nintendo characters
Super Smash Bros. fighters
Video game characters introduced in 2001
Nintendo protagonists
Shapeshifter characters in video games
Race-related controversies in video games
Fictional humanoids